Rozenfeld is a surname. Notable people with the surname include:

 Arthur Rozenfeld (born 1995), French-Israeli professional basketball player
 Carina Rozenfeld (born 1972), French author
 Lev Borisovich Rozenfeld (1883–1936), Bolshevik revolutionary and a prominent Soviet politician
 Michał Rozenfeld (1916–1943), Jewish resistance activist during the Second World War
 Shalom Rozenfeld (1800–1851), rabbi

See also
 Rozenfeld and KO AD
 Staging Point (Rozenfeld)
 Rosenfeld

Surnames